= Dropping a Han Dynasty Urn =

1995 photographic work by Ai Weiwei

Dropping a Han Dynasty Urn is a photographic artwork created by Ai Weiwei in 1995. Composed of three 148 by 121 cm black-and-white photographs, it documents Ai holding, dropping, and standing over the remains of a Han dynasty urn that was approximately 2,000 years old. Ai broke two urns worth a few thousand dollars to complete this series of photographs, as the first group of photographs failed to capture the process.

== Process ==
The urn used in Ai Weiwei's work was one of a group of Han urns that Ai acquired in the 1990s. This was Ai's second work using these urns. The first was Han Jar Overpainted with Coca-Cola Logo, created in 1994. During the process of Dropping a Han Dynasty Urn, Ai chose another urn to re-photograph because the first shot failed to capture the descent of the urn.

== Related works ==
In 2006, Ai selected 51 of the Han urns he had acquired to create Colored Vases, which was exhibited at the Hirshhorn Museum and Sculpture Garden in conjunction with Dropping a Han Dynasty Urn. The work was recreated in Lego bricks in 2015.

== See also ==
Fragments of History, from 2012, is a work by Manuel Salvisberg that imitates or parodies Dropping a Han Dynasty Urn. Three black-and-white photographs show Swiss art collector Uli Sigg dropping a replica of one of the vases from Ai's Han Jar Overpainted with Coca-Cola Logo series. Sigg, who is a friend of Ai, described the photos as "something to shock Ai Weiwei".

In 2014, one Miami artist imitated Dropping a Han Dynasty Urn, destroying one of Ai's vases from the Colored Vases series at the Pérez Art Museum exhibition.
